Morinville Community High School (MCHS) is a Catholic high school located in Morinville, Alberta, Canada.  It is part of the Greater St. Albert Catholic Schools.  MCHS is the only high school serving the Morinville community.

The school was founded in November 1994 and teaches students from grade 9-12.  Their athletic teams are called the "Prairie Wolves," or just the "Wolves."

History
Morinville was for a long time served by high schools in neighbouring towns: the much older and larger settlement of St. Albert to the south, and the small agricultural village of Legal to the north. The Grey Nuns had established a small convent, schoolhouse, and hospital in what was to become the settlement of St. Albert in 1864. The Catholic Church continued to dominate education in the region even after the first public school boards were formed, as most of the population was Catholic. In the earliest days, each school had its own board, and St. Albert had a school board as early as 1885 when both St. Albert Roman Catholic Public District no. 3 and nearby Bellerose Roman Catholic Public District no. 6 were both formed to operate one-room schools that went up to grade 8, the legal requirement at the time (Bellerose School was later moved to Fort Edmonton Park where it still stands).

The first school district founded in the Morinville area was the Thibault Roman Catholic School Public District. The school was named after the founder, Father Thibault who started a mission and a school in 1892. Nearby Legal, Alberta got its school district in 1907, and later a secondary school: St. Emile High School.  Morinville then had the same schooling situation for several decades, with elementary in town, and high schools to the north and south.  The most notable change of that period was in 1980 when French immersion was officially offered in the Morinville schools, reversing decades of "English-only" policy in what that originally been a francophone settlement.
In 1993, Legal's St. Emile High School closed.  The Thibault School District opened Morinville Community High School on November 3, 1994.  The first principal of MCHS was Paul O’Dea.

On January 1, 1995, the three main schools in Legal and Morinville were joined into the Greater St. Albert Catholic Regional Division or GSACRD as part of a wave of school board consolidations across Alberta at that time.

When MCHS was first opened the grade 9 hallway was not part of the school. It was only added later when the number of grade 9s in G.H. Primeau School was too high.

Courses and programs
Morinville Community High School offers many different Courses, including all courses required by the Province of Alberta, plus a wide selection of options. It also provides programs called iLearn and RAP. Quite a few of these courses are offered in French as well.

Core program
The core studies include Mathematics, English/Language Arts, Social Studies, Science (including Biology, Chemistry, Physics and Forensic Science), and French immersion.

Optional studies
Students are provided the option to study
 Art
 Drama
 Computer Graphics
 Media and Communications
 MCTV
 Music
 Band
 Chorus
 Guitar
 Instrumental instruction
 Construction
 Home Economics
 Foods
 Fashion
 Cafeteria prep
 Early Child Care
 Cosmetology
 French language
 Leadership
 Religion
 Film Studies
 Legal Studies
 Medical Studies
 Sports
 Sport Medicine
 Learning Strategies
 Work experience

Athletics

Western Canadian Challenge
The Western Canadian Challenge (WCC) is an annual volleyball tournament that is hosted each October by Morinville Community High School.  The tournament's sponsors are ASICS, Pepsi, United Cycle, Mizuno, and the Morinville Lions Club.  The tournament has been every year since 1995, and has hosted as many as 96 teams from all over Canada and the United States, as well as a few teams from other countries.

School Mascot
The school teams play under the name "The Prairie Wolves" or simply "The Wolves". The school mascot is a wolf named Big Bad Joe.

Team Sports
MCHS supports teams in the following sports:
 Volleyball
 Basketball
 Badminton
 Curling
 Golf
 Track and field teams
 Cross Country
 Cheerleading (Stunt)

Intramural Sports
MCHS Moriniville community high school offers a number of intramural sports as well.  These vary from year to year, and have included:
 Floor Hockey
 Basketball
 Soccer

Student Activities
MCHS offers students a variety of extracurricular activities:
 Student Council
 Students Against Drinking and Driving
 Drum Circle
 Garbage Crew
 Yearbook Committee
 Interact Club (a student-organized charitable works group)
 MCTV (a TV show inside the school run by students and Greg Boutestein)

Arts

Drama
MCHS annually produces a musical drawn from the standard Broadway repertory.

Coffee House
Students may partake in an annual "coffee house" style talent show.

 Other arts
MCHS hosts a band, chorus, and jazz ensemble.

References

External links
 Morinville Community High School
 Greater St. Albert Catholic Schools
 Greg Boutestein

High schools in Alberta
Educational institutions established in 1994
1994 establishments in Alberta